A Night Out is a 1915 Charlie Chaplin comedy short. It was Chaplin's first film with Edna Purviance, who would continue as his leading lady for the following eight years.  It was also Chaplin's first film with Essanay Film Company in Niles, California.  Chaplin's first Essanay film, His New Job, was made in the Chicago studio, after which he moved to Niles Studios.  He found Purviance in San Francisco when he was searching for a leading lady for his films.  A Night Out also stars Ben Turpin, Leo White and Bud Jamison.

Cast
 Charles Chaplin - Reveller
 Ben Turpin - Fellow Reveller
 Bud Jamison - Headwaiter
 Edna Purviance - Headwaiter's Wife
 Leo White - 'French' Dandy/Desk clerk
 Fred Goodwins - Old clerk at the hotel

External links

1915 films
Short films directed by Charlie Chaplin
American silent short films
American black-and-white films
Essanay Studios films
1915 comedy films
Silent American comedy films
Articles containing video clips
1915 short films
American comedy short films
1910s American films